Emilie Ullerup (born 27 October 1984) is a Danish actress. She is best known for playing Ashley Magnus on the television series Sanctuary and Bree O'Brien on the Hallmark Channel drama series Chesapeake Shores.

Early life and education
Ullerup was born in Copenhagen, Denmark, as a child of a diplomatic family, daughter of Ove Ullerup (né Ullerup-Petersen). After graduating from high school in Copenhagen in 2003, she moved to Vancouver, Lower Mainland, British Columbia, Canada, and attended the Vancouver Film School, graduating in 2005.

Career
Ullerup's first role was that of Julia Brynn on the remake television series of Battlestar Galactica in 2006, which aired on the Sci Fi Channel. She played Ashley Magnus in the first and second seasons of the television show Sanctuary until her character was written out. Her departure remained a topic of heated debate among fans, with many of them wanting her brought back in future episodes, until the show was cancelled in 2012.

In 2016, Ullerup was cast as Bree O'Brien in Chesapeake Shores. Ullerup played Maggie Thomas, the estranged wife of Michael Thomas, in the disaster movie Asteroid: Final Impact (2015). Since 2016 Ullerup has had a recurring role as Dale Travers in Hallmark's Signed, Sealed, Delivered movies series.

Personal life
Ullerup speaks Danish, English and Vietnamese. Her father held the title of Lord Chamberlain for the Danish Royal Family.

In 2008, she was found to have a benign but aggressive tumor wrapped around her spinal nerves. She underwent surgery to remove the tumor in 2009, at which time her coccyx and half of the sacrum of her pelvis were removed. After about five months, she recovered enough to return to work.

On 14 August 2018, she married her longtime boyfriend photographer Kyle Cassie.

Filmography

Film

Television

Awards
 2008 Leo Award – Best Lead Performance by a Female in a Drama Series for her role as Kaitlin Joyce on JPod

Nominations
 2012 Leo Award - Best Supporting Performance by a Female in a Dramatic Series (Arctic Air)
 2013 Leo Award - Best Supporting Performance by a Female in a Dramatic Series (Arctic Air)
 2013 Leo Award - Best Supporting Performance by a Female in a Motion Picture (Death Do Us Part)
 2013 UBCP/ACTRA Awards - Best Actress (Arctic Air)

References

External links
 

1984 births
Danish film actresses
Danish television actresses
Danish expatriates in Canada
Danish emigrants to Canada
Living people
21st-century Danish actresses
Actresses from Copenhagen
Vancouver Film School alumni